Open Toed and Flapping is an album by Wild Willy Barrett; released in 1995, it is a collection of folk songs. Barrett was backed by his then current live band.

Track listing

Musical personnel

Wild Willy Barrett:
Vocals [1, 2, 4, 6, 8, 9, 11]
Guitar [6, 7, 10, 11, 13]
Banjo [1, 2]
Fiddle [1, 2, 8]
Piano [4]
Harmonium [7]
Balalaika [8]
Mark Freeman
Cardboard Box [1, 2, 6, 8, 9]
Pallet [1, 2, 4, 6, 8]
Vocals [2, 4, 11]
400 Gallon Diesel Tank [1]
Owl [2]
Castanets [4]
Fish [6]
Heavy Gauge Corrugated Iron [10]
Paul Ward
Harmonium [1, 2, 6, 8, 9]
Linton
Blues Harp

References

1995 albums